Jesse Juarez (born May 8, 1981) is an American mixed martial artist currently competing in the Welterweight division of the Absolute Championship Berkut. A professional competitor since 2006, Juarez has also formerly competed for Strikeforce, Bellator MMA, the MFC, and Shark Fights. He holds a win at Welterweight over former UFC Middleweight champion Robert Whittaker.

Background
Originally from Torrance, California, Juarez is of French, Italian, and Tongan descent. Juarez attended North Torrance High School where he competed in wrestling, football, and track and field, earning All-American honors for wrestling. Juarez later continued his wrestling career at Golden West College where he was a JUCO All-American and California JC state champion before transferring to Montana State University-Northern. Juarez was a two-time NAIA All-American and was a 2005 NAIA National Champion at Montana State University-Northern. Juarez had been introduced to mixed martial arts while wrestling in high school and later transitioned into mixed martial arts after college.

Mixed martial arts career

Early career
Juarez started his professional career in 2006. He fought mainly for California-based promotions as Strikeforce, Gladiator Challenge and Invincible.

He faced Luke Stewart on September 20, 2008 at Strikeforce: At The Mansion II. He lost via submission due to an armbar in the first round.

Bellator MMA
Juarez made his promotional debut against Mikey Gomez on April 10, 2009 at Bellator 2. He won via TKO in the first round.

Juarez next faced Deray Davis on May 15, 2009 at Bellator 7–8. Once again he won via TKO in round one.

Juarez did a rematch against Mikey Gomez on June 5, 2009 at Bellator 10. He won via unanimous decision (30–27, 30–27, 30–27).

Maximum Fighting Championship and Cage Fighting Championship
Juarez made his promotional debut in MFC against Joe Christopher on December 4, 2009 at MFC 23. He won via unanimous decision.

Juarez faced Nathan Gunn on February 26, 2010 at MFC 24. He won via knockout with a head kick at 11 seconds of round one.

Juarez made his promotional debut in Cage Fighting Championship against Justin Murray on April 16, 2010 at CFC 13 for the welterweight title. Juarez defeated Murray via majority decision (49–47, 48–48, 48–47) after five rounds and became the CFC welterweight title holder.

Juarez faced Douglas Lima on November 12, 2010 at MFC 27 for the MFC Welterweight Championship. He lost via submission due to a triangle armbar in the third round.

Juarez defended his CFC Welterweight Championship against Manuel Rodriguez on August 26, 2011 at CFC 18. He defeated Rodriguez via unanimous decision (50–45, 50–45, 49–47) after five rounds to retain his belt.

Juarez defended the CFC Championship against Robert Whittaker on May 18, 2012 at CFC 21. He defeated Whittaker via unanimous decision (49–46, 48–47, 48–47) after five rounds to retain the title.

Return to Bellator MMA
In 2013, Juarez returned to Bellator MMA. He faced Jordan Smith on February 21, 2013 at Bellator 90. He won via split decision (30–27, 29–28, 28–29) after a hard-fought match.

Juarez faced Joe Williams on November 2, 2013 at Bellator 106. He won via submission due to a guillotine choke in the very first round.

Juarez was scheduled to face Andrey Koreshkov in the quarterfinal match of Bellator season ten welterweight tournament on March 14, 2014 at Bellator 112. However, after the removal of other tournament competitors citing injuries, the tournament line-up was shifted and Juarez instead faced Adam McDonough. He lost the fight via unanimous decision.

Juarez faced Ron Keslar on September 19, 2014 at Bellator 125. He won the fight via unanimous decision.

Juarez was expected to face Brennan Ward at Bellator 134 on February 27, 2015. However, Ward was moved up to the main card to face Curtis Millender after Millender's opponent, Michael Page, pulled out of the fight due to a cut over his left eye. Juarez was removed from the fight card as a result.

Juarez faced Ricky Rainey at Bellator 137 on May 15, 2015. He lost the fight via knockout in the second round.

In June 2015, it was revealed that Juarez and 7 other fighters were released from the promotion.

Absolute Championship Berkut
Juarez faced Beslan Isaev on May 6, 2016 at ACB 35. He lost the fight via submission in the first round.

Championships and accomplishments

Amateur wrestling
 National Association of Intercollegiate Athletics
 NAIA All-American  (2004–05)
 NAIA National Championship 184 lb: Champion  (2005)
 NAIA National Championship 174 lb: 5th place  (2004)
 NAIA North Region Championship 174 lb: Champion  (2004)
 California Community College Athletic Association
 CCCAA State Championship 184 lb: Champion  (2001)
 National High School Coaches Association
 NHSCA All-American  (2000)
 NHSCA Senior Nationals 171 lb: 7th place  (2000)

Mixed martial arts
 Cage Fighting Championship
 CFC Welterweight Championship (One time)
 Two successful title defenses
 Invincible
 Invincible Middleweight Championship (One time)
 Invincible Welterweight Championship (One time)

Mixed martial arts record

|-
| Loss
| align=center | 23–13
| Alexei Ivanov
| TKO (punches)
| League S-70: Plotforma 7th
| 
| align=center | 1
| align=center | 4:30
| Sochi, Krasnodar krai, Russia
|Catchweight (181 lbs) bout.
|-
| Loss
| align=center | 23–12
| Beslan Isaev
| Submission (armbar)
| |ACB 35: In Memory of Guram Gugenishvili
| 
| align=center | 1
| align=center | 4:44
| Tbilisi, Georgia
|
|-
| Win
| align=center | 23–11
| Frank Schuman
| Submission (arm triangle choke)
| KOTC: Title At The Torch
| 
| align=center | 1
| align=center | 3:47
| Lac du Flambeau, Wisconsin, United States
|
|-
| Loss
| align=center | 22–11
| Ricky Rainey
| KO (knee)
| Bellator 137
| 
| align=center | 2
| align=center | 1:13
| Temecula, California, United States
|
|-
| Loss
| align=center | 22–10
| Khusein Khaliev
| Submission (choke)
| Battle in Grozny
| 
| align=center | 1
| align=center | N/A
| Grozny, Russia
|
|-
| Win
| align=center | 22–9
| Ron Keslar
| Decision (unanimous)
| Bellator 125
| 
| align=center | 3
| align=center | 5:00
| Fresno, California, United States
|
|-
| Loss
| align=center | 21–9
| Adam McDonough
| Decision (unanimous)
| Bellator 112
| 
| align=center | 3
| align=center | 5:00
| Hammond, Indiana, United States
| 
|-
| Win
| align=center | 21–8
| Joe Williams
| Submission (guillotine choke)
| Bellator 106
| 
| align=center | 1
| align=center | 0:57
| Long Beach, California, United States
|
|-
| Win
| align=center | 20–8
| Daniel McWilliams
| TKO (punches)
| BAMMA USA: Badbeat 10
| 
| align=center | 1
| align=center | 2:24
| Commerce, California, United States
|
|-
| Win
| align=center | 19–8
| Jordan Smith
| Decision (split)
| Bellator 90
| 
| align=center | 3
| align=center | 5:00
| Salt Lake City, Utah, United States
|
|-
| Win
| align=center | 18–8
| Robert Whittaker
| Decision (unanimous)
| Cage Fighting Championship 21
| 
| align=center | 5
| align=center | 5:00
| Sydney, Australia
| 
|-
| Loss
| align=center | 17–8
| Leandro Silva
| TKO (doctor stoppage)
| EFWC: The Untamed 2
| 
| align=center | 1
| align=center | 5:00
| Anaheim, California, United States
|
|-
| Win
| align=center | 17–7
| Gadji Zaipulaev
| Submission (rear-naked choke)
| FEFoMP: Battle of Empires 1
| 
| align=center | 2
| align=center | 2:15
| Khabarovsk, Russia
|
|-
| Win
| align=center | 16–7
| Manuel Rodriguez
| Decision (unanimous)
| CFC 18: Juarez vs. Rodriguez
| 
| align=center | 5
| align=center | 5:00
| Sydney, Australia
| 
|-
| Loss
| align=center | 15–7
| Josh Neer
| TKO (injury)
| Shark Fights 16: Neer vs. Juarez
| 
| align=center | 1
| align=center | 5:00
| Odessa, Texas, United States
|
|-
| Loss
| align=center | 15–6
| Douglas Lima
| Submission (triangle armbar)
| MFC 27
| 
| align=center | 3
| align=center | 2:37
| Enoch, Alberta, Canada
| 
|-
| Win
| align=center | 15–5
| Justin Murray
| Decision (majority)
| Cage Fighting Championships 13
| 
| align=center | 5
| align=center | 5:00
| Southport, Queensland, Australia
| 
|-
| Win
| align=center | 14–5
| Mauro Chimento Jr.
| Submission (rear-naked choke)
| Collision in the Cage
| 
| align=center | 3
| align=center | 1:42
| Irvine, California, United States
|
|-
| Win
| align=center | 13–5
| Nathan Gunn
| KO (head kick)
| MFC 24
| 
| align=center | 1
| align=center | 0:11
| Enoch, Alberta, Canada
|
|-
| Win
| align=center | 12–5
| Joe Christopher
| Decision (unanimous)
| MFC 23
| 
| align=center | 3
| align=center | 5:00
| Enoch, Alberta, Canada
|
|-
| Win
| align=center | 11–5
| Mikey Gomez
| Decision (unanimous)
| Bellator 10
| 
| align=center | 3
| align=center | 5:00
| Ontario, California, United States
| 
|-
| Win
| align=center | 10–5
| Deray Davis
| TKO (punches)
| Bellator 7–8
| 
| align=center | 2
| align=center | 4:47
| Chicago, Illinois, United States
|
|-
| Win
| align=center | 9–5
| Mikey Gomez
| TKO (punches)
| Bellator 2
| 
| align=center | 1
| align=center | 4:23
| Uncasville, Connecticut, United States
|
|-
| Win
| align=center | 8–5
| John Fleming
| Submission (guillotine choke)
| Colosseo Championship Fighting
| 
| align=center | 1
| align=center | 0:46
| Edmonton, Alberta, Canada
|
|-
| Win
| align=center | 7–5
| Thomas Kenney
| Submission (punches)
| Long Beach Fight Night 3
| 
| align=center | 2
| align=center | 2:07
| Long Beach, California, United States
|
|-
| Loss
| align=center | 6–5
| Luke Stewart
| Submission (armbar)
| Strikeforce: At The Mansion II
| 
| align=center | 1
| align=center | 4:55
| Beverly Hills, California, United States
|
|-
| Win
| align=center | 6–4
| John Walsh
| TKO
| Long Beach Fight Night 1
| 
| align=center | 1
| align=center | 2:14
| Long Beach, California, United States
|
|-
| Loss
| align=center | 5–4
| Bret Bergmark
| Decision (unanimous)
| Iroquois MMA Championships 3
| 
| align=center | 3
| align=center | 5:00
| Iroquois, Ontario, Canada
|
|-
| Win
| align=center | 5–3
| Erik Meaders
| Submission (verbal)
| Invincible MMA
| 
| align=center | 4
| align=center | 0:51
| Ontario, California, United States
| 
|-
| Loss
| align=center | 4–3
| Casey Ryan
| Submission (triangle choke)
| TC 25: Fight Club
| 
| align=center | 1
| align=center | 2:27
| San Diego, California, United States
|
|-
| Loss
| align=center | 4–2
| Fabio Nascimento
| Submission (punches)
| EFWC: The Untamed
| 
| align=center | 1
| align=center | 4:50
| Anaheim, California, United States
|
|-
| Win
| align=center | 4–1
| Robert Sarkozi
| N/A
| GC 69: Bad Intentions
| 
| align=center | 1
| align=center | N/A
| Sacramento, California, United States
|
|-
| Win
| align=center | 3–1
| Jaime Fletcher
| Decision (unanimous)
| Invincible 4: It's All About the Action
| 
| align=center | 5
| align=center | N/A
| Ontario, California, United States
| 
|-
| Win
| align=center | 2–1
| Jacob Nudel
| Submission (armbar)
| Total Fighting Alliance 6
| 
| align=center | 1
| align=center | 1:02
| Santa Monica, California, United States
|
|-
| Loss
| align=center | 1–1
| Bryan Baker
| Submission (rear-naked choke)
| Chaos in the Cage 2
| 
| align=center | 3
| align=center | 1:38
| San Bernardino, California, United States
|
|-
| Win
| align=center | 1–0
| Guillermo Smith
| KO
| Extreme Full Contact 3
| 
| align=center | 1
| align=center | 0:43
| Mexicali, Baja California, Mexico
|

References

1981 births
Living people
Montana State University–Northern alumni
American male sport wrestlers
American male mixed martial artists
Mixed martial artists from California
Welterweight mixed martial artists
Mixed martial artists utilizing collegiate wrestling
Sportspeople from Torrance, California